William Rune Liltved (born 1960) is a South African malacologist and botanist.

Liltved completed high school 1979 and was employed by South African Museum, Cape Town. He studied marine molluscs at California Academy of Sciences in San Francisco. His career has taken him to study molluscs in tropical South Pacific, New Zealand, Australia, the Caribbean and Mediterranean sea, Californian west coast and gulf of California, Gough Island and Tristan da Cunha, and extensively off southern Africa.

Publications

References

1960 births
Living people
20th-century South African botanists
South African malacologists
21st-century South African botanists